The Ibom Isi also known as the Akpa are one of the three main lineages compromising the Aro people. They are centered in Ibom, Arochukwu in Nigeria. This Aro lineage is originally from the present day Akwa Ibom State in Southeastern Nigeria.

During the Aro-Ibibio Wars in present-day Arochukwu in the 17th-18th century, an Igbo leader named Okennachi (the first Igbo EzeAro), invited his allies the princes Osim and Akuma Nnubi from the east of the Cross River to assist him in overrunning the Ibibios and granting them lands. The Nnubis, led their people known as the Akpa to present-day Arochukwu. They led the Akpa forces to ally with Igbo forces and defeat the Ibibios. Though Osim Nnubi died, the Aros defeated the Ibibios and captured the area and Akuma became the first EzeAro or king. Akpa people are mainly in Ibom and other towns belonging to the Ibom Isi kindred. They have highly influenced the Cross River Igbo culture.

References 
https://web.archive.org/web/20070505044829/http://www.aronewsonline.org/html/history_culture.html
http://people.bu.edu/manfredi/Contours.pdf
History of Africa from earliest times to 1800 Volume 1 by Harry A. Gailey Jr.

Aros
Ekoi